Justice Stiles may refer to:

George P. Stiles, associate justice of the Utah Territorial Supreme Court
Theodore L. Stiles, associate justice of the Washington Supreme Court